The Iraqi-Polish relations are the official bilateral relations and diplomatic relations between Iraq and Poland. Iraq has an embassy held in Warsaw. Poland has an embassy in Baghdad.

History

1940s
In 1942, during the evacuation of Polish civilians from the USSR in World War II, some Polish military personnel under General Władysław Anders, were evacuated to Iraq, while some Polish civilians went to refugee camps in Iran.

1980s
In the 1980s, Poland stayed neutral in the Iran–Iraq War.

1990s

In August 1990, following Saddam Hussein's invasion of Kuwait, Polish intelligence agents rescued six U.S. intelligence officers out of Iraq (via Turkey). At the time, several thousand Poles were in Iraq working on construction projects, given them a greater ability to avoid detection by Iraqi intelligence. Poland's assistance to the U.S. during the Persian Gulf War, which was revealed in 1995, led to closer U.S.-Poland relations.

Iraq War

In 2003, Poland participated in the U.S.-led 2003 invasion of Iraq, sending about 200 special forces initially. During the Iraq War, Poland was responsible for the Polish zone in Iraq, between Baghdad and Basra; this was one of the four occupation zones in Iraq at the time. Within Poland, there was some disappointment over a sense "that Poland derived too little benefit from its deployment: its efforts to end the visa requirement for the U.S. were rebuffed, and its military complained that it did not get as much financial assistance as it had expected." In 2006, more than 10,500 Polish troops were in Iraq.  At the end of 2008, all 900 Polish troops remaining in Iraq were withdrawn, with about a dozen Polish military advisors remaining.

Anti-ISIL coalition
After the Islamic State of Iraq and the Levant threatened Iraq in 2014, Poland provided humanitarian aid to Iraq and gave political support to Operation Inherent Resolve, but hesitated for nearly two years before joining the anti-ISIL military campaign in June 2016. Poland has been an active member of the anti-ISIL coalition since.

See also
 Foreign relations of Iraq 
 Foreign relations of Poland

References

External links
Embassy of the Republic of Poland, Baghdad
Embassy of Iraq, Warsaw

 
Poland
Iraq